Under some metadata standards, time is a representation term used to specify a time of day in the ISO 8601 time format.

Note that Time should not be confused with the DateAndTime representation term which requires that both the date and time to be supplied.

Metadata registries that use the time representation term
 NIEM
 ebXML
 GJXDM

See also
 metadata
 ISO/IEC 11179
 Representation term
 ISO 8601

Metadata
Representation term